Wolgamot is a surname. Notable people with the surname include:

 Earl Wolgamot (1892–1970), American baseball player and manager
 John Barton Wolgamot (1910–1980), American poet